

Total statistics

Statistics by country

Statistics by competition

UEFA Intertoto Cup

Romanian football clubs in international competitions